

Career 

Shahram Gholami was born in Tehran, Iran, in 1974 and began learning oud and Iranian Classical music at the age of 20. Under the tutelage of Mansoor Nariman,
Some of his activities in Iran and overseas have been mentioned as follows:
•	Member of Iran National Orchestra by conducting Master Farhad Fakhredini (1998 to 2007)
•	Solo Oud concert in Dellaville Theatre (2014)
•	Trio Concert with Arshid Azin and Habib Meftah Boshehri in New Morning-Paris (2014)
•	Oud player in Shahram Nazeri concerts (2010 to 2013) in collaboration with Moulavi or Rumi ensemble (Shahram Nazeri), Aref ensemble (Parviz Meshkatian), Dastan ensemble (Hamid Motebasem) and Ardashir Kamkar.
•	Playing Oud in Oslo World Music Festival
•	Founding Mayan Ensemble 2018

Discography 

1)	Dirine Delkhah (Oud and Vocal, 2017)
2)	Solook, in collaboration with Habib Meftah Booshehri (published by Melmax Company –Paris 2014)
3)	Circles, in collaboration with Pejman Haddadi(2014)
4)	Trio by the name, ONE DAY,  in collaboration with Rajib chakraporty and Pejman Haddadi, published by Hermes 2013
5)	Duet HELHELE, in collaboration with Habib Meftah Booshehri 2013
6)	Solo TOLOE KAVIR, 2007
7)	Quartet SE OUD, 2014

References 

1974 births
Living people
Iranian oud players
Musicians from Tehran